South Sea Islanders are the Australian descendants of Pacific Islanders from more than 80 islandsincluding the Oceanian archipelagoes of the Solomon Islands, New Caledonia, Vanuatu, Fiji, the Gilbert Islands, and New Irelandwho were kidnapped or recruited between the mid to late 19th century as labourers in the sugarcane fields of Queensland. Some were kidnapped or tricked (or "blackbirded") into long-term indentured service. At its height, the recruiting accounted for over half the adult male population of some islands.

These people were generally referred to as Kanakas, which means "man", although many Islander descendants now regard the term as pejorative and an insulting reminder of their ancestors' exploitation at the hands of white planters.

With time, owing to intermarriage, many Australian South Sea Islanders also claim a mixed ancestry, including Aboriginals, Torres Strait Islanders and immigrants from the South Pacific Islands.

Under the 'Polynesian Labourers Act 1868 (Qld)' recruited labour was indentured for three years in exchange for a small wage of £6 per year as well as rations, accommodation and clothing. Employers were required to deposit their employees wages into a Government Savings Bank account.

The majority were repatriated by the Australian Government in the period between 1906 and 1908 under the  Pacific Island Labourers Act 1901, a piece of legislation related to the White Australia policy. There was resistance to repatriation, and controversy regarding the manner in which it was done.

Those exempted from repatriation, along with a number of others who escaped deportation, remained in Australia to form the basis of what is today Australia's largest non-indigenous black ethnic group. Today, the descendants of those who remained are officially referred to as South Sea Islanders. A 1992 census of South Sea Islanders reported around 10,000 descendants living in Queensland. Fewer than 3,500 were reported in the 2001 Australian census.

The question of how many Islanders were "blackbirded" is unknown and remains controversial. The extent to which Islanders were recruited legally, persuaded, deceived, coerced or forced to leave their homes and travel to Queensland is difficult to evaluate and also controversial. Official documents and accounts from the period often conflict with the oral tradition passed down to the descendants of workers. Stories of blatantly violent kidnapping tend to relate to the first ten or so years of the trade.

History

Prominent Australian South Sea Islanders 
In recent generations, facing many similar forms of discrimination in Australia as Aboriginal Australians and Torres Strait Islanders, Australian South Sea Islanders have been prominent figures in civil rights and politics. Faith Bandler, Evelyn Scott and Bonita Mabo (widow of Eddie Mabo) are prominent Indigenous activists who are also descendants of South Sea Island plantation workers. Stephen Andrew, who represents Pauline Hanson's One Nation in the Queensland Parliament, was the first South Sea Islander to be elected to parliament. Federal MP Terry Young's grandfather was a South Sea Islander.

Another area Australian South Sea Islanders have excelled in is sport, especially the game of rugby league. Australian international representatives Sam Backo, Mal Meninga, Gorden Tallis and Wendell Sailor are all members of the Australian South Sea Islander community.

Recognition 
For many years, Queensland's South Sea Islander communities sought acknowledgement for past treatment, and recognition as a distinct cultural group. After decades of community advocacy, the Commonwealth Government finally recognised that distinction on August 25, 1994. State Library of Queensland holds several collections pertaining to the history of Australian South Sea Islanders in Queensland, two significant collections pertain to their long fight for recognition.

The Australian South Sea Islanders United Council Records 1975-2008, 2021 (Acc. 28617) includes documents, research papers, photographs, recorded interviews and other material relating to the work of the Australian South Sea Islanders United Council (ASSIUC) from the mid 1970s. Formed by a group of first descendants at Tweed Heads in 1975, the ASSIUC was the first national body to represent Australian South Sea Islanders, advocating for national recognition and promoting cultural awareness. A second iteration of the ASSIUC was re-registered in Townsville in 1991 and grew to fourteen branches including two in New South Wales. This body was instrumental in bringing communities together and advocating for change.

The Australian South Sea Islanders 150 Commemoration and Festival 2013 Papers (Acc. 29744) also include documents such as meeting minutes and correspondence relating to the Australian South Sea Islanders Secretariat Inc., and photographs and interviews conducted by Nic Maclellan on 13 August 2013 at the Australian South Sea Islander 150th Anniversary event at Ormiston House, Brisbane.

See also 
White Australia Policy
Kanaka (Pacific Island worker)
 Blackbirding

References

Attribution

External links

Background and history of the South Sea Islanders at the Queensland Department of Premier and Cabinet website.
Australian South Sea Islanders - State Library of Queensland
Plantation Voices - State Library of Queensland exhibition
Australian South Sea Islander collections - State Library of Queensland
Sugar Slaves - State Library of Queensland
Australian South Sea Islanders 150 Commemoration and Festival 2013 Papers 2013 - State Library of Queensland
Australian South Sea Islanders United Council Records 1975-2008 - State Library of Queensland
The old place: Lot 71, Bli Bli, Queensland - State Library of Queensland. Interviews commissioned for the 2019 Queensland exhibition Plantation Voices: Contemporary conversations with Australian South Sea islanders.

Australian people of Melanesian descent
Oceanian Australian
Ethnic groups in Australia
Ethnic groups in Oceania
Labour history of Australia
Slavery in Australia
Slavery in Oceania